Ikonen is a Finnish surname. Notable people with the surname include:

 Anna-Kaisa Ikonen (born 1977), Finnish politician
 Ansa Ikonen (1913–1989), Finnish film and theater actress
 Henri Ikonen (born 1994), Finnish professional ice hockey forward
 Jasse Ikonen (born 1990), Finnish professional ice hockey player
 Johanna Ikonen (born 1969), Finnish female ice hockey player
 Joni Ikonen (born 1999), Finnish ice hockey forward
 Juha Ikonen (born 1970),  Finnish professional ice hockey player
 Juuso Ikonen (born 1995), Finnish professional ice hockey player
 Kari Ikonen (born 1973), Finnish pianist, Moog player, composer and Master of Music
 Leander Ikonen (1860–1918), Finnish architect and politician
 OG Ikonen, Finnish rapper
 Oskari Ikonen (1883–1938), Finnish politician
 Ossi Ikonen (born 1990), Finnish professional ice hockey defenceman
 Pasi Ikonen (born 1980), Finnish orienteering competitor
 Pekka Ikonen (1877–1956), Finnish farmer, bank director and politician
 Pentti Ikonen (1934–2007), Finnish swimmer
 Toivo Ikonen (1891–1976), Finnish farmer, bank director and politician
 Väinö Ikonen (1895–1954), Finnish wrestler

Finnish-language surnames